Yellow Flowers is an Indian film production company established by Ramesh Puppala. The company is based in Hyderabad.

Films produced

References

Film production companies based in Hyderabad, India
Indian companies established in 2011
2011 establishments in Andhra Pradesh